Hibhib Sport Club, is an Iraqi football team based in Diyala, that plays in Iraq Division Three.

Managerial history
 Akram Ghadhban
 Hussein Abid-Ali Al-Saadi

See also 
 2002–03 Iraq FA Cup
 2019–20 Iraq FA Cup

References

External links
 Hibhib SC on Goalzz.com
 Iraq Clubs- Foundation Dates

1998 establishments in Iraq
Association football clubs established in 1998
Football clubs in Diyala